Oleksandr Vyacheslavovych Slobodian (: born February 21, 1956, in Ternopil, Ukraine) is a Ukrainian millionaire businessman and politician. He is the original CEO and current honorary president of the Kyiv-based Obolon CJSC, Europe's largest brewing company, and the president of the Ukrainian Premier League football club Obolon Kyiv (both since 1998).

Biography
Slobodian graduated from the Kiev Technological Institute of Food Science in 1978. Since 1980 he works for Obolon CJSC. In 1989, he became CEO and in 1993 the head of the board of Obolon. In 1998, he landed th posts President of CJSC Obolon and President of FC Obolon Kyiv.

Slobodian was also a long-time member of parliament in the Verkhovna Rada (from 1998 till December 2012), representing the Our Ukraine Bloc & Our Ukraine–People's Self-Defense Bloc as a member of Ukrainian People's Party from 2002 till December 2012. Slobodian is a member of the Ukrainian People's Party since 1997. Since 1999 he is deputy head of the party. In the 2012 parliamentary election Slobodian unsuccessfully tried to get (re)-elected into parliament by falling to win a single-member districts (number 187) (first-past-the-post wins a parliament seat) located in Khmelnytskyi as an independent candidate. He was runner-up in the district with 28.26% of the votes.

On February 21, 2013 FC Obolon Kyiv (which he was the president of) withdrew voluntarily from the Ukrainian First League after Slobodyan had refused to finance the club after goalkeeper Kostyantyn Makhnovskyi was sold by the club without his consent. In December 2012 Slobodian announced he would create a new team under the moniker "Obolon Brovar".

Slobodian did not participate in the 2014 Ukrainian parliamentary election.

References

External links 
Obolon CJSC's website 
Profile on Verkhovna Rada website

1956 births
Living people
People from Ternopil
Ukrainian food industry businesspeople
People's Movement of Ukraine politicians
Ukrainian People's Party politicians
Independent politicians in Ukraine
Ukrainian football chairmen and investors
National University of Food Technologies alumni
20th-century Ukrainian engineers
FC Obolon Kyiv
Obolon (company)
Third convocation members of the Verkhovna Rada
Fourth convocation members of the Verkhovna Rada
Sixth convocation members of the Verkhovna Rada
21st-century Ukrainian engineers